Kevin Bonnet (born 31 January 1983), better known as Keen'V, earlier Keen V, is a French ragga musician. He made his breakthrough with the single "J'aimerais trop" during 2011, peaking at number 3 on the French Singles Chart.

Biography 
Kevin Bonnet was born on January 31, 1983 in Rouen, Seine-Maritime, France. He studied at the André Maurois college in La Saussaye and then at the Ferdinand Buisson high school in Elbeuf. Subsequently, he became a volunteer firefighter in Amfreville-la-Campagne, and DJ and entertainer at the "Moulin Rose" nightclub in Belbeuf and at César's in Gournay-en-Bray. The beginnings of Keen'v are made at the "Moulin Rose", the DJ of the discotheque offers him to take the turntables and Kévin accepts the offer. Because the public appreciates his performance, the singer decides to return and finds himself alone in front of an audience for the first time.

In 2005, he met the composer Fabrice Vanvert (also known as Fab'V), with whom he composed the songs Loco la salsa and Soca soca te quiero, and performed in around fifty nightclubs in France. He met singers Obed and L'Rayan and together, they released a music video, Dancehall Musik, composed by Fab'V. A few months later, he met DJ Yaz who asked him to become his producer. He then obtains a contract at Universal Music which allows him to release new titles. In 2007, he met Toy Nawaach, a dancer from Limoges who would become his sidekick on stage.

Discography

Albums

Singles

*Did not appear in the official Belgian Ultratop 50 charts, but rather in the bubbling under Ultratip charts. Position in table above reflect actual Ultratip positions plus 50 additional positions added.

Awards
During NRJ Music Awards 2012, he received the award for "Francophone Revelation of the Year".

References

External links 
Official homepage

1983 births
Living people
Musicians from Rouen
Dancehall musicians
21st-century French singers
21st-century French male singers